Radziszewo may refer to the following places:
Radziszewo, Warmian-Masurian Voivodeship (north Poland)
Radziszewo, Goleniów County in West Pomeranian Voivodeship (north-west Poland)
Radziszewo, Gryfino County in West Pomeranian Voivodeship (north-west Poland)
Radziszewo, Stargard County in West Pomeranian Voivodeship (north-west Poland)